Nuh Naci Yazgan University (Turkish:Nuh Naci Yazgan Üniversitesi) is a university located in Kayseri, Turkey. It was established in 2009.

References

External links
Official Website

Universities and colleges in Turkey
Educational institutions established in 2009
2009 establishments in Turkey
Kayseri